Newen is a French television production company, the producers of such shows as Versailles, Braquo, and Plus belle la vie.

In November 2015, TF1, France's leading television network, bought a 70% share of Fabrice Larue's FLCP, the holding company of Newen.

Newen is the second-largest producer of drama in France. It owns Telfrance, Agence CAPA, Be Aware and 17 juin Me, with Telfrance producing the soap, Plus belle la vie.

Capa is the producer of Braquo and Versailles.

In May 2017, Newen Group launched a €50 million investment fund focused on acquiring British drama. In 2018, it was announced that Newen had acquired a 60% equity interest in production outfit, Punkin, through Tuvalu Media Group. It was also announced that Newen acquired a 33% equity stake in production outfit, Nimbus. Newen would continue its acquisition run with the July 2019 acquisition of a majority stake in Canadian production outfit Reel One Entertainment.

Fabrice Larue is the founder, CEO and chairman of Newen Group.

Productions
Braquo
Versailles
Plus belle la vie

References

Television production companies of France
French companies established in 2008
Mass media companies established in 2008
Mass media in Paris